Borova is an urban-type settlement in Fastiv Raion of Kyiv Oblast (province) of Ukraine, located on the Stugna River. It belongs to Fastiv urban hromada, one of the hromadas of Ukraine. The Molovylivka railway station is located in the centre of the settlement. The population is

References

Fastiv Raion
Urban-type settlements in Fastiv Raion